{{Infobox election
| election_name     = 2004 United States Senate election in Hawaii
| country           = Hawaii
| type              = presidential
| ongoing           = no
| previous_election = 1998 United States Senate election in Hawaii
| previous_year     = 1998
| next_election     = 2010 United States Senate election in Hawaii
| next_year         = 2010
| election_date     = November 2, 2004
| image_size         = x150px

| image1            = Daniel Inouye official portrait.jpg
| nominee1          = Daniel Inouye
| party1            = Democratic Party (United States)
| popular_vote1     = 313,629
| percentage1       = 75.5%

| image2            = Cam Cavasso (cropped).jpg
| nominee2          = Campbell Cavasso
| party2            = Republican Party (United States)
| popular_vote2     = 87,172
| percentage2       = 21.0%

| map_image          = 2004 United States Senate election in Hawaii results map by county.svg
| map_size           = 250px
| map_caption        = County resultsInouye:  
| title             = U.S. Senator
| before_election   = Daniel Inouye
| before_party      = Democratic Party (United States)
| after_election    = Daniel Inouye
| after_party       = Democratic Party (United States)
}}

The 2004 United States Senate election in Hawaii''' took place on November 2, 2004 alongside other elections to the United States Senate in other states as well as elections to the United States House of Representatives and various state and local elections. Incumbent Democrat U.S. Senator Daniel Inouye won re-election to an eighth term in yet another landslide with over 75% of the vote, despite the state's relatively close single-digit margin of victory for John Kerry in the concurrent presidential election.

Major candidates

Democratic 
 Daniel Inouye, incumbent U.S. Senator

Republican 
 Campbell Cavasso, former State Representative and candidate for Lieutenant Governor in 2002

General election

Predictions

Results 
Inouye won every county with at least 70% of the vote. His best performance was in Kauai County, where he won with about 80%; also was Cavasso's weakest performance, getting just 16.5% of the vote there.

See also 
 2004 United States Senate elections

References 

2004 Hawaii elections
2004
Hawaii
Daniel Inouye